The following highways are numbered 731:

Costa Rica
 National Route 731

United States